Underdale High School is a medium-sized government secondary school, located in Underdale in the western suburbs of Adelaide.

School facilities and resources 
School facilities include music and drama suites, a library and an automotive centre. Sporting facilities include a gymnasium and weights room, two soccer pitches, eight tennis courts, and 2 basketball courts within the Gymnasium (1 full and 2 half courts).
The school has a specialist Football (Soccer) Academy, a Gifted Program, and an Automotive Program.

Since late 2018, Underdale has also constructed a STEM Area, allowing for students to engage in Scientific, Technological, Engineering and Mathematical Studies.

In 2020, the Department for Education engaged contractor BESIX Watpac to complete a renovation to the existing Tech Studies, Home Economics, Woodwork, Metalwork, Outdoor Courts and Landscaping, Gymnasium, East Wing, West Wing and Administration areas. This work also included the construction of a new Creative Arts facility and relocation of a Canteen and installation of various sheds. The works were completed in 2021.

Curriculum 
Source:
 English
 Art ~ Music or Drama
 Mathematics
 PD/Health/PE/Football
 Humanities ~ Geography, History or SOSE
 Science
 Industrial Arts
 2nd Language
 Special Education
 Home Economics
 Technology
Year 7-10 curriculum International Baccalaureate
Year 11-12 curriculum South Australian Certificate of Education ("SACE")

Languages 
Underdale offers courses in English as a foreign or second language, Japanese (日本語 Nihongo), and Greek (Ελληνικά, Ellīniká). Underdale hosts many international students, for short and long stays.

Notable alumni 
 Liam Bekric - Australian swimming team Rio Paralympics 
 Brett Burton - AFL footballer Adelaide
 Alison Davies - Australian Women's rowing eight Atlanta and Sydney Olympics
 Glenn Freeborn - AFL footballer North Melbourne, Collingwood
 Scott Freeborn - AFL footballer Carlton
 David Hookes - Australian Cricketer
 Jennifer (Vesnaver) Hogan - Australian representative rower and Emmy award-winning journalist
 Lucas Pantelis A-League Soccer Player
 Nick Pesch - AFL footballer Adelaide and Melbourne
 Robert Pyman - AFL footballer North Melbourne, Collingwood and Melbourne
 Louise Stacey - Australian Open Tennis participant and youngest ever winner of Australian Hardcourt  Tennis title.
 James Troisi - Professional Footballer (Socceroos)
 Aurelio Vidmar - Australian National soccer team and Socceroos Assistant Coach
 Tony Vidmar - Australian National soccer team
 Al Hassan Toure - Professional Footballer (Macarthur FC & Olyroos)
 Mohamed Toure - Professional Footballer (Adelaide United & Olyroos)

References

Special interest high schools in South Australia
Educational institutions established in 1965
1965 establishments in Australia